The Paulista Football Championship of 2021 was the 29th edition of this championship women's football organized by the Paulista Football Federation (FPF). Played between August and December, the competition will have twelve participants.

Format
The 2021 Campeonato Paulista de Futebol Feminino was held in three stages:

In the first stage, the twelve teams were placed in a single group. Each team in the group played each other, and the four teams at the top of the table advanced to the semifinals. The teams that finished 5th through 8th place competed in the Copa Paulista.

In the semifinal phase, the top 4 teams were placed in two groups of two, with the first group containing the 2nd and 3rd placed teams and the second group containing the first and fourth placed teams. Each team played one home match and one away match. The teams from each group with the most points after two matches qualified for the finals. The semifinal groups followed the same tiebreaker criteria as the group stage.

The final phase was disputed by the top finishers of the two semifinal groups. The two teams each played a home and away match to determine the winner. The final group phase followed the same tiebreaker criteria as the semifinal phase and the group stage.

Tiebreaker criteria
In the case of tie between two and more teams the following criteria will be used:

Number of wins
Goal difference
Goals Scored
Fewer red cards received
Fewer yellow cards received
Drawing of lots

Teams

Standings

Bracket

Semifinals

Semi-finals

|} 

São Paulo won 5-0 on aggregate and advanced to the final.

Corinthians won 5-1 on aggregate and advanced to the final.

Final

|}

Top goalscorers

References

Women's football competitions in Brazil
Campeonato Paulista seasons